Guoquan Road, is a station on Line 10 of the Shanghai Metro. It began operation on 10 April 2010. It is located at the intersection of Siping Road and Guoquan Road. It became an interchange station with Line 18 when the line opened on 30 December 2021.

Station Layout

References 

Railway stations in Shanghai
Line 10, Shanghai Metro
Line 18, Shanghai Metro
Railway stations in China opened in 2010
Shanghai Metro stations in Yangpu District